Lim Na-young (born December 18, 1995), also known as Im Nayoung, known mononymously as Nayoung, is a South Korean singer, rapper and actress signed under Sublime Artist Agency. She was first known after participating in the survival show Produce 101 and finishing in tenth place, which made her debut as a member of project girl group I.O.I in 2016. The group was only active for less than one year before disbanding in January 2017. Later that year, she returned to Pledis Entertainment and debuted as a member of Pristin in March 2017. In May 2019, Pristin officially disbanded and Lim later parted ways with the agency. She joined Sublime Artist Agency for her solo activities in August 2019.

Early life and education
Lim was born December 18, 1995 in Gwanak District, Seoul, South Korea. She attended the Muhak Girls' High School and later the Dongduk Women's University (Department of Broadcasting).

Career

2016: Produce 101 and debut with I.O.I

From January 22 to April 1, 2016, Lim participated in Mnet's survival television show, Produce 101, which consisted of 101 female trainees from different agencies in South Korea. Five participants from Pledis Entertainment were eliminated and only Lim and Kyulkyung made it to the final line up of I.O.I. She ranked tenth with a total 138,726 votes.

On May 4, I.O.I made their debut with the extended play, Chrysalis, and its lead single, "Dream Girls".

2017–2019: Disbandment of I.O.I and Pristin

After the disbandment of I.O.I on January 29, Pledis Entertainment announced that Lim and Kyulkyung would debut as members of Pristin on March 21, 2017. On the same day, Pristin released their debut EP, Hi! Pristin, accompanied by the lead single, "Wee Woo".

In 2018, Pledis Entertainment formed Pristin's subgroup, Pristin V, with Lim being one of its members. They debuted on May 28 with the single album, Like a V.

On May 24, 2019, Pristin was officially disbanded and Pledis Entertainment announced that Lim would be departing from the label. On August 22, 2019, she signed an exclusive contract with Sublime Artist Agency. Four days later, she was appointed promotional ambassador for tourist destination Insadong.

2020–present: Solo beginnings
Lim starred as a supporting role in Flower of Evil playing as the young Do Hae-soo. In 2021, she played her first main role in the web drama Summer Guys alongside Kang Mi-na and more. Lim made a soundtrack appearance on Summer Guys with "So So" (그냥 그렇다고), released on April 7, 2021. She made her film debut in Twenty Hacker and sang the soundtrack, "Not just friends", for the film. On April 15, 2021, Nayoung released two tracks as part of part 4 of Twenty Hackers soundtrack with "With All My Heart" (온맘다해) as the title track as well as "Like The Two Of Us" (우리 둘처럼). She played the supporting role for KBS2 drama Imitation, released on May 7, 2021. She is also set to play the main role of Hyun-ah in KBS1 drama Over To You.

On May 4, 2021, Lim Na-young and the members of I.O.I celebrated their 5th debut anniversary with a reunion live stream show called "Yes, I Love It!". 

In June 2021, Lim confirmed to make her debut in the musical I Loved You with a debut in August 2021.

Discography

Soundtrack appearances

Filmography

Film

Television series

Web series

Television shows

Theatre

Ambassadorship 
Public Relations Ambassador of Asan Police Station (2021)

Songwriting credits
All song credits are adapted from the Korea Music Copyright Association's database, unless otherwise noted.

Notes

References

External links

 Lim Na-young at Sublime Artist Agency
 
 

1995 births
Living people
People from Seoul
Actresses from Seoul
Singers from Seoul
Rappers from Seoul
South Korean women pop singers
South Korean female idols
South Korean television actresses
South Korean web series actresses
South Korean musical theatre actresses
I.O.I members
Pledis Entertainment artists
Pristin members
Produce 101 contestants
Swing Entertainment artists
21st-century South Korean women singers
21st-century South Korean singers
21st-century South Korean actresses